Phú Giáo is a rural district of Bình Dương province in the Southeast region of Vietnam. As of 2003 the district had a population of 67,252. The district covers 541 km2. The district capital lies at Phước Vĩnh.

Administrative divisions
The district contains one township, Phước Vĩnh, and the following communes: Tân Long, Tam Lập, An Long, An Bình, Tân Hiệp, An Linh, Phước Sang, Vĩnh Hòa, Phước Hòa and An Thái.

References

Districts of Bình Dương province